A buying center, also called decision-making unit (DMU), brings together "all those members of an organization who become involved in the buying process for a particular product or service".

The concept of a DMU was developed in 1967 by Robinson, Farris and Wind (1967). A DMU consists of all the people of an organization, who are involved in the buying decision.
The decision to purchase involves those with purchasing and financial expertise; those with technical expertise and of course the top-management. McDonald, Rogers & Woodburn (2000) say that identifying and influencing all the people involved in the buying decision is a prerequisite in the process of sales.

The concept of a buying center (as a focus of business-to-business marketing, and as a core fundamental in creating customer value and influence in organisational efficiency and effectiveness) formulates the understanding of purchasing decision-making in complex environments.

Some of the key factors influencing a buying center or DMU's activities include:
 Buy class (e.g. straight rebuy, new task or modified rebuy)
 Product type (e.g. materials, components, plant and equipment and MRO (maintenance, repair and operation)
 Importance of the purchase

In some cases the buying center is an informal ad hoc group, but in other cases, it is a formally sanctioned group with specific mandates,

Decision-making process 
When the DMU wants to purchase a certain product or service the following steps are taken inside the buying center:
 Need or problem recognition: the recognition can start for two reasons. The first reason can be to solve a specific problem of the company. The other reason can be to improve a company's current operations/performance or to pursue new market opportunities.
 Determining product specification: The specification includes the peculiarities which the product/service that is going to be purchased must contain.
 Supplier and product search: this process contains the search for suppliers that can meet a company's product or service needs. First a supplier that matches with the specifications of the company has to be found. The second condition is that the supplier can satisfy the organizations financial and supply requirements.
 Evaluation of proposals and selection of suppliers: the different possible suppliers will be evaluated by the different departments of the company.
 Selection of order routine: this stadium starts after the selection of the supplier. It mainly consists of negotiating and agreeing with the supplier about certain details.
 Performance feedback and evaluation: performance and quality of the purchased goods will be evaluated.

In this process of making decisions different roles can be given to certain members of the center of the unit depending on the importance of the part of the organization.

Buying center size 
American research undertaken by McWilliams in 1992 found out that the mean size of these buying centers mainly consists of four people. The range in this research was between three and five people. The type of purchase that has to be done and the stage of the buying process influence the size. More recent research found that the structure, including the size, of buying centers depends on the organizational structure, with centralization and formalization driving the development of large buying centers.

Conceptual and methodological issues in buying center research 
There are several issues concerning buying centers which need additional research. These issues can be divided into various spheres:

Buying center boundaries and buying center domain  
Distinguishing the buying center from its environment, also defining and delimiting the activities of a particular buying center.

Buying center structure  
Understanding how organizational structure may differ from or may shape the structure of the buying center and examining how a particular buying strategy may serve to mediate the effects of environmental uncertainty on the structure of the buying center.

Process considerations in buying center  
Power and conflict issues within the buying center.

Decision making  
One stream of research focuses on the number of decision phases and their timing and the other emphasizes the type of decision-making model (or choice routine) utilized.

Communications flow  
The informal interactions that emerge during the buying process.

References

Business-to-business
Organizational behavior
Procurement